Axel & Pixel is a point-and-click adventure video game developed by Silver Wish Games. The game was released on October 14, 2009 for the Xbox 360's Xbox Live Arcade service and on October 7, 2010 for Steam.

The game revolves around Axel, a painter, and his dog Pixel, who awake in a beautiful, yet perilous, dream world of Axel's own creation.  Together, they must solve the mysteries of Axel's landscapes to get through the dream world by defeating the Ice Giant and helping Axel fulfill his greatest wish - to paint a picture of all four seasons in a single day.

Gameplay
The game is a traditional point-and-click adventure, where the player has to logically come up with answers and solutions to riddles and problems that are encountered during the course of the game. As a way of making Axel & Pixel unique from other point-and-click adventures, the cursor is made up of a group of glittering lights, which change colour slightly if the player lands the cursor on a point of interest. Aside from the traditional point-and-click mechanics, the game also features different platform mini-games (hot-air balloon through a cave, driving through the mountains, or sailing a boat downstream). The game also makes use of quick time events in a few of the chapters as ways of helping Axel scale walls or avoiding dangerous obstacles. The game is divided into four sections - in the form of the four calendar seasons - which are unlocked through natural progression of the story. Each of the mini-games featured are used once in story mode as ways of pursuing Evil Rat through the dream world, from the last chapter of the current calendar season into the beginning of the next one. Unlike most point-and-click adventures, Axel & Pixel contains no dialogue option between characters, in an attempt to keep the gameplay focused more on solving the puzzles instead of interactions. Axel, however, will speak gibberish to Pixel and to himself occasionally.

Plot
Axel & Pixel tells the story of a painter, Axel, and his dog, Pixel, as they embark on a fantastic journey through the surreal and dangerous dream world of Axel's own artistic creation after the two are hypnotised by a lullaby record. Upon entering the dream world, the primary antagonist, Evil Rat, is found to be in possession of the key which Axel needs to exit the dream world. The first chapter features the same snowy environment outside as in the real world - albeit, with an array of weird and wonderful creatures - but, upon completion of the chapter, the pair move into Spring, where the environments are very flowered, colourful and are inhabited by creatures such as giant honeybees, hard-shelled sheep and a plethora of insect species. Arriving at a derelict temple, Evil Rat destroys a large monument of a golden snake with a missile. After re-assembling the monument and obtaining the paint brush atop the monument, Evil Rat flees the scene on a missile - using it as a form of transport - while Axel quickly paints a hot air balloon in thin air with the paintbrush and boards it with Pixel to pursue Evil Rat into Summer.

Upon arriving in Summer, Pixel is snatched and taken away by a giant dragonfly. Like Spring, the environments are very flowered, but now feature a new selection of creatures, such as large, orange boars; piranha worms and a giant tortoise with continuous track wheels instead of hind legs. After saving a marooned Pixel from a piranha worm-infested pond, the two are reunited and move on where they encounter the iconic giant tortoise with continuous track wheels. The pair encounter Evil Rat again shortly after, who appears to be constructing a ramshackle automobile shortly before Axel soaks him with an ornamental water feature and he drives off hurriedly. Axel quickly paints a bright yellow car in thin air and the pair give chase through a series of hills into Autumn, where the environments now feature a much more vibrant tone in colour, with an emphasis on oranges and, especially, browns. Upon arriving in Autumn, Axel totals his car into the side of a mountain, which he resolves by inflating the tyre to bursting-point and bouncing on it to get to the higher cliffs. As the only way of exiting the cliffs, Axel restores the power to a nearby ski lift, giving the pair the chance to escape. The ski lift drops the pair off at a beaver dam, where they encounter Pesky Hedgehog guarding a ladder to the sewers. Pole vaulting across the river, Axel, with Pixel's help, uncovers a hidden giant catapult, which Axel proceeds to fill with boulders, firing them at the nearby dam, eventually breaking through, sweeping Pesky Hedgehog off his feet and carrying him away in the waves, leaving Axel and Pixel to descend into the sewers. The pair finally re-emerge above ground after Axel restores power to an escalator. Arriving at an oil well, the pair encounter Evil Rat just before he speeds off in a ramshackle speedboat. After clearing the nearby lake of an oil spill, Axel obtains a paintbrush from a newly reanimated tree and paints his final vehicle in thin air: a small sail boat which the pair use to pursue Evil Rat through icy, whirlpool-laden waters into Winter, where the environments are now covered in ice, snow and coloured with white, blues and black, and feature creatures typically suited to colder climates, such as penguins, a large snow cat and a sarcopterygii fish.

Upon arriving in Winter, Evil Rat - disguised as a snowman - knocks Axel into the icy river with a snowball, who surfaces completely encapsulated in ice. Pixel, who managed to jump out of the boat in time, hoists the frozen Axel onto a nearby sled and the pair take off down the side of the mountain into a cave where Pixel manages to melt the ice around Axel with steam from a boiler pipe. With Axel fully mobile, the pair solve their final puzzle by playing a secret tune on a set of ice drums, opening the doors to the Ice Giant's lair. Inside, Axel defeats Evil Rat with snowballs and claims the key back to reality, but not before defeating the Ice Giant in a series of QTEs; Axel manages to climb atop the Ice Giant's head where the final paintbrush is located, which Axel uses to paint a wrecking ball in thin air, knocking the Ice Giant down into a chasm. Having thwarted the Ice Giant, Axel paints the doors to reality in thin air and the pair enter, where Axel (depending on whether the player collected all of the tubes of paint and paintings), with his newly obtained muse, fulfils his greatest wish by painting a picture of the four seasons in a single day.

Reception

The Xbox 360 version received above-average reviews according to the review aggregation website Metacritic. Axel & Pixel was described by critics as "a charming and surreal trip." The dream world, especially, was received with acclaim, with critics calling it "bizarre and beautiful," "unique and charming" and "graceful and fresh." The game was primarily criticized for its short length, as the story can be completed in roughly three hours.

Since its release, the game sold 13,552 units worldwide on the Xbox 360 as of January 2011. Sales had moved to 18,772 units by the end of 2011.

References

External links

2009 video games
2K Czech games
Fantasy video games
Point-and-click adventure games
Video games developed in the Czech Republic
Windows games
Xbox 360 Live Arcade games
Xbox 360 games